Arup Roy is an Indian politician. He was a cabinet Minister in Charge for Co-operations department, of Government of West Bengal since May 20, 2011. He was also an MLA, elected from the Howrah Madhya constituency in the 2011 West Bengal state assembly election.
He had been re-elected in 2016 and 2021 West Bengal Legislative Assembly election. He is the District president of All India Trinamool Congress from Howrah.

References 

State cabinet ministers of West Bengal
West Bengal MLAs 2011–2016
West Bengal MLAs 2016–2021
Trinamool Congress politicians from West Bengal
Living people
1956 births